Punch commonly refers to:
 Punch (combat), a strike made using the hand closed into a fist
 Punch (drink), a wide assortment of drinks, non-alcoholic or alcoholic, generally containing fruit or fruit juice

Punch may also refer to:

Places
 Punch, U.S. Virgin Islands
 Poonch (disambiguation), often spelt as Punch, several places in India and Pakistan

People
 Punch (surname), a list of people with the name
 Punch (nickname), a list of people with the nickname
 Punch Masenamela (born 1986), South African footballer
 Punch (rapper), 21st century American rapper Terrence Louis Henderson Jr.
 Punch (singer), South Korean singer Bae Jin-young (born 1993)

Arts, entertainment and media

Fictional entities
 Mr. Punch (also known as Pulcinella or Pulcinello), the principal puppet character in the traditional Punch and Judy puppet show
 Mr. Punch, the masthead image and nominal editor of Punch, largely borrowed from the puppet show
 Mr. Punch, a fictional character in Neil Gaiman's graphic novel, The Tragical Comedy or Comical Tragedy of Mr. Punch (1994)
 Punch, a DC Comics villain and partner of Jewelee's in Punch and Jewelee
 Punch/Counterpunch, a fictional character in The Transformers

Films
 Punch (1994 film), a boxing film starring Donald Sutherland
 Punch (2002 film), a Canadian film starring Sonja Bennett and Michael Riley
 Punch (2011 film), a South Korean film
 Punch (2022 film), a New Zealand film starring Tim Roth
 Punch, a 1996 American short film starring Sacha Baron Cohen

Manga
 Punch!, a 2005 manga by Rie Takada

Music
 Punch (band), an American punk band
 Punch Records, a UK music and arts development agency
 Punch (album), a 2008 album by Punch Brothers featuring Chris Thile

Periodicals
 Punch (Danish magazine), an illustrated conservative Danish satirical magazine (1873–1894)
 Punch (magazine), a former British weekly magazine of humour and satire
 Adelaide Punch (1878–1884), a satirical magazine published in Adelaide, South Australia
 Japan Punch (1862–1887), a satirical magazine published in Yokohama, Japan
 Melbourne Punch (1855–1925), a satirical magazine published in Melbourne, Australia
 Sydney Punch (1864–1888), a satirical magazine published in Sydney, Australia
 The Punch (Australia), news website (2009–2013)
 The Punch, Nigerian daily newspaper

Television
 Punch (TV series), a 2014 South Korean television drama series
 Punch, a station identification for the television station BBC Choice, used in 1998
 Punch! (TV series), a Canadian animated comedy series
 Producciones PUNCH (often shortened to PUNCH), a Colombian programadora from 1956 to 2000
 "Punch (Space Ghost Coast to Coast)", an episode of Space Ghost Coast to Coast

Other
Punch (website), a drinks website owned by Vox Media

Tools
 Punch (numismatics), an intermediate used in the process of manufacturing coins
 Punch (tool), a tool used to drive objects such as nails, to pierce workpieces, or to form an impression of the tip on a workpiece
 Punch (typography), a steel pattern used in casting metal type
 Hole punch, a common office tool used to create holes in sheets of paper
 Leather punch, a specialized tool for making holes in leather

Other uses 
 Punch (cigar), the name of two brands of premium cigar
 Punch Taverns, a United Kingdom pub company
 Dodona (genus), a group of butterflies commonly known as the Punches, in particular:
 Dodona eugenes, a Dodona commonly known as the Punch
 Polarimeter to Unify the Corona and Heliosphere (PUNCH), a NASA constellation of 4 microsatellites to study the Sun

See also
 
 
 Punch Brothers, an American band
 Punches (album), a 2005 album by World Leader Pretend

 Punsch, a traditional Swedish and Finnish liquor
 Poonch (disambiguation)